Also known as Just Research, Justsystem Pittsburgh Research Center (JPRC) was a late-1990s computer science research laboratory in Pittsburgh, loosely associated with Carnegie Mellon University. Its director was Dr. Scott Fahlman.

During its relatively brief existence, from May 1996 to July 2000, JPRC performed work in machine vision, text classification and summarization, programming environments and user interface design.

Just Research researchers included:

 Dr Vibhu Mittal
 Dr Andrew McCallum
 Mr Mark Kantrowitz
 Dr Mikako Harada
 Mr Paul Gleichauf
 Dr Rahul Sukthankar
 Dr Michael Witbrock
 Mr Antoine Brusseau
 Dr Shumeet Baluja
 Mrs Keiko Hasegawa
 Dr Dayne Freitag
 Dr Rich Caruana
 Dr David "Pablo" Cohn

See also
 JustSystems

References

Research institutes in Pennsylvania
Computer science institutes in the United States
Carnegie Mellon University
1996 establishments in Pennsylvania
2000 disestablishments in Pennsylvania